The New Home School and Church is a historic community building on McKisic Creek Road south of Bella Vista, Arkansas.  It is a modest single-story wood-frame structure, with a gable roof, which lacks ornamentation.  Its main facade has a double-door entrance, and the side facades have three bays of windows.  Built c. 1900, it is a well-preserved example of a multifunction vernacular community building, which was used as a school during the week and as a church on Sundays.  The school function was discontinued after schools in the area were consolidated.

It appears to have functioned as a one-room schoolhouse.

The building was listed on the National Register of Historic Places in 1988.

See also
National Register of Historic Places listings in Benton County, Arkansas

References

Churches on the National Register of Historic Places in Arkansas
School buildings on the National Register of Historic Places in Arkansas
One-room schoolhouses in Arkansas
Churches completed in 1900
Churches in Benton County, Arkansas
National Register of Historic Places in Benton County, Arkansas
Buildings and structures in Bella Vista, Arkansas
Schools in Benton County, Arkansas
1900 establishments in Arkansas